Thomas Leberfinger (born 5 January 1990) is a German footballer who plays for Kirchanschöring.

External links

1990 births
People from Deggendorf
Sportspeople from Lower Bavaria
Footballers from Bavaria
Living people
German footballers
Association football defenders
Association football midfielders
SV Wacker Burghausen players
TSV Buchbach players
3. Liga players
Bayernliga players
Regionalliga players